is a passenger railway station in located in the town of Kihoku, Kitamuro District, Mie Prefecture, Japan, operated by Central Japan Railway Company (JR Tōkai).

Lines

Station layout
The station consists of two opposed side platforms connected to the station building by a footbridge.The wooden station building dates from the original construction. However, normally only platform 1 is in use for bi-directional traffic.

Platforms

History 
Funatsu Station opened on 19 December 1934 on the Japanese Government Railways (JGR) Kisei East Line. From 1941-1958, the  also operated to this station. The JGR became the Japan National Railways (JNR) after World War 2, and the line was extended to Kuki Station by 12 January 1957. The line was renamed the Kisei Main Line on 15 July 1959. The station was absorbed into the JR Central network upon the privatization of the JNR on 1 April 1987. The station has been unattended since 31 March 2005.

Passenger statistics
In fiscal 2019, the station was used by an average of 68 passengers daily (boarding passengers only).

Surrounding area
Kihoku Municipal Mifune Junior High School
Miyama Kyodo Museum
 Kihoku Town Hall Funatsu Branch Office

See also
List of railway stations in Japan

References

External links

 JR Central timetable 

Railway stations in Japan opened in 1934
Railway stations in Mie Prefecture
Kihoku, Mie